Troopergate may refer to:

Alaska Public Safety Commissioner dismissal, allegations regarding Alaska Governor Sarah Palin, Republican nominee for Vice President of the United States in 2008
Eliot Spitzer political surveillance controversy, allegations made in 2007 regarding New York Governor Eliot Spitzer
Troopergate (Bill Clinton), allegations regarding Arkansas Governor Bill Clinton, made in 1993 when he was forty-second President of the United States